"Lazy Sunday" is a song by the English band Small Faces, which reached number two on the UK Singles Chart in 1968. It was written by the Small Faces songwriting duo Steve Marriott and Ronnie Lane, and appeared on the band's 1968 concept album Ogdens' Nut Gone Flake. Against the band's wishes, it preceded the album as a single release.

Song information 
"Lazy Sunday" has a traditional cockney East End of London music-hall sound.  The song was inspired by Marriott's feuds with his neighbours and is also noticeable for its distinct vocal changes. Marriott sings large parts of the song in a greatly exaggerated cockney accent, partly due to an argument he had with the Hollies, who said that Marriott had never sung in his own accent. In the final bridge and the last two choruses, he reverts to his usual transatlantic (singing) accent. John Lydon cited the Small Faces as one of his few influences as vocalist for the Sex Pistols, and evidence of Marriott's influence can be found in this song.

According to Small Faces keyboardist Ian McLagan, Lane's "rooty dooty di" vocal lines were in imitation of a member of the Who's road crew; the two bands had recently toured Australia together.

At 51 seconds, the vocal backing quotes the "Colonel Bogey March" by F. J. Ricketts and, at 1 minute 45 seconds, "(I Can't Get No) Satisfaction" by the Rolling Stones. At the end of the song the tune dissolves into birdsong and church bells.

"Lazy Sunday" appears as track six on the album Ogdens' Nut Gone Flake, and is the last track on Side A of the vinyl release.  Despite its success, the single was released against the band's wishes and contributed to Marriott's departure.

The song was used in the 2009 British comedy film The Boat That Rocked.

Music video
The low-budget promotional video for "Lazy Sunday" was filmed at various locations, including Kenney Jones's parents' home on Havering Street in Stepney, east London.

Covers and inspiration
 The song was later covered by the Toy Dolls as on their 1995 album Orcastrated.
 The London-based indie rock/garage revival band The Libertines covered the song in 2003 as part of the soundtrack to British film Blackball. It is also available as part of the Blackball OST album.
 Leeds-based indie rock band Kaiser Chiefs covered the song on French radio in 2008.
 Hard rock band Thunder covered the song live, which was included on the 2009 remastered edition of their 1992 album Laughing on Judgement Day
Jack Wild recorded a version of this song for his first studio album The Jack Wild Album.

See also
 Small Faces discography

References

Sources

External links

1968 singles
1976 singles
Small Faces songs
Songs written by Steve Marriott
Songs written by Ronnie Lane
1968 songs
Immediate Records singles